K-Swing, real name Katie Kabel, is an American DJ/Producer specializing in electronic dance music, specifically Rockbeat (coined for being a mixture of rock and roll and breakbeat) and electro house. She is from New Jersey, USA. In 2004 she was nominated for the Best Breakthrough DJ Award at the 2004 Dancestar USA: American Dance Music Award show. In 2006 she was signed to Adam Freeland's Marine Parade record label and was called the best "undiscovered" DJ. Her first single, This Is The Sound was co-produced with British producer Kevin Beber. Adam Freeland and Sebi Spanks did a remix of this single.

Katie spent over 20 years of her life as a classically trained singer and dancer. Until 2004 – when her DJ career became too busy – she taught jazz, ballet, and modern dance. As a teenager, her continuous thirst for music and motion propelled her into the dance community, where she was drawn to the sounds of breakbeat for its deep and funky bass lines. Katie found it to offer the most freedom of movement, interpretation and self-expression of all forms of dance music.

Discography 
Singles:
 K-Swing & Beber – This Is The Sound

References

External links
Official K-Swing Site

Club DJs
American electronic musicians
American house musicians
Living people
Year of birth missing (living people)
American women in electronic music
21st-century American women